Jane Stratton (born August 10, 1953) is a former professional tennis player from the United States.

Biography
Stratton grew up in Utah and was the first woman to receive an athletic scholarship to the University of Utah. She played collegiate tennis for four years, earning All-American honors on three occasions. During this time she competed at the 1973 Summer Universiade and won a bronze medal in the women's doubles.

On the professional circuit she was most successful as a doubles player. She was runner-up in the doubles at two tour events, the 1975 Canadian Open and Pittsburgh Open in 1979. At both the 1975 US Open and 1977 Wimbledon Championships she was a women's doubles quarter-finalist, partnering JoAnne Russell and Mimi Wikstedt respectively. She also made the quarter-finals of the mixed doubles at the 1979 Wimbledon Championships with David Sherbeck. In singles she twice reached the third round at Wimbledon, in 1977 and 1980.

Following her retirement she taught tennis in Salt Lake City, then in 1983 founded a company called Promotion Sports, with one of her former doubles partners, San Diego based Argentine Raquel Giscafré. The pair went on to run the Southern California Open, a WTA Tour event held in the lead up to the US Open, which attracted top players and eventually gained Tier I status.

WTA Tour finals

Doubles (0–2)

References

External links
 
 

1953 births
Living people
American female tennis players
Utah Utes women's tennis players
Tennis people from Utah
American sports businesspeople
Universiade medalists in tennis
College women's tennis players in the United States
Universiade bronze medalists for the United States
Medalists at the 1973 Summer Universiade